David López García (born 13 May 1981) is a Spanish former professional road racing cyclist, who competed between 2003 and 2018 for the Café Baqué,  and  squads.

Career
López was born in Barakaldo. The biggest victory of his career was the ninth stage of the 2010 Vuelta a España, a mountain stage with 6 categorized climbs on the menu.

Major results

2004
 6th Overall Tour de l'Avenir
2005
 7th Overall Vuelta a Aragón
2006
 7th Overall Volta a la Comunitat Valenciana
2007
 2nd Subida a Urkiola
 3rd Overall Deutschland Tour
1st Stage 5
 4th Klasika Primavera
 6th Overall Paris–Nice
 6th Overall Vuelta a Castilla y León
2008
 3rd GP Ouest–France
 4th Subida a Urkiola
 10th Overall Tour du Limousin
2009
 3rd Subida al Naranco
 7th Overall Vuelta a Andalucía
 8th Cholet-Pays de Loire
2010
 1st Stage 9 Vuelta a España
2011
 2nd Klasika Primavera
 6th Overall Vuelta a Burgos
 7th Overall Tour of the Basque Country
 7th Overall Tour Méditerranéen
 9th Overall Critérium International
2012
 4th Overall Vuelta a Asturias
 4th Klasika Primavera
 8th Prueba Villafranca de Ordizia
2013
 1st Stage 6 Eneco Tour
 3rd Overall Tour of Beijing
 4th Overall Tour of Britain
 4th Japan Cup
2015
 3rd Overall Tour of Norway
2016
 Vuelta a España
1st Stage 1 (TTT) 
 Combativity award Stage 12

Grand Tour general classification results timeline

References

External links

 David López profile at Team Sky
 Palmares on CyclingBase (French)
 

Cyclists from the Basque Country (autonomous community)
Sportspeople from Barakaldo
Spanish male cyclists
1981 births
Living people
Spanish Vuelta a España stage winners